Alemani is a Polish nobility coat of arms originated from Italy.

History

The Alemani coat of arms was a family crest brought to Poland from Italy by Dominik Allemani who received an Indygenat (recognition of foreign status as a noble) from King of Poland Zygmunt August on 19 April 1566. Dominik Allemani became a stolnik of Lublin and starost of Nowe Miasto

Blazon

<Azure, two bends or impaling argent three pellets two and one.  Crest: issuant from a crest coronet or a demi-maiden habited azure, crined or, wearing a wreath vert and holding in her dexter hand a wreath of the same, her sinister hand resting on her hip.  Mantled dexter or and azure, sinister sable and argent.>

Notable bearers

Notable bearers of this Coat of Arms include:
 Dominik Alemani

See also
 Polish heraldry
 Heraldic family
 List of Polish nobility coats of arms

Bibliography
 Józef Szymański: Herbarz rycerstwa polskiego z XVI wieku. Warszawa: DiG, 2001. . str. 7
 Barbara Trelińska: Album armorum nobilium Regni Poloniae XV-XVIII saec.. Lublin: Uniwersytet Marii Curie-Skłodowskiej, 2001. . str. 151-152
 Tadeusz Gajl: Herbarz polski od średniowiecza do XX wieku : ponad 4500 herbów szlacheckich 37 tysięcy nazwisk 55 tysięcy rodów. L&L, 2007. .

External links 
 http://pl.wikisource.org/wiki/Encyklopedia_staropolska/Alemani
 http://gajl.wielcy.pl/herby_nazwiska.php?lang=pl&herb=alemani

References

Alemani